Sani Basantpur is a village council situated in Goriakothi Block in Siwan district of Bihar state, India. It belongs to Saran division. It is located 21 km towards east from district headquarters Siwan and 117 km from the state capital Patna. Sani Basantpur's PIN code is 841439. Mustfabad is sub post office of Sani Basantpur. Nearby cities to Sani Basantpur is Siwan, Maharajganj, Barauli, Gopalganj

History 
Sani Basantpur is situated in the western part of the State, was originally a sub-division of Saran district.

Geography 
Situated on bank of Gandak River, one of the major rivers of Nepal and a left bank tributary of the Ganges in India.

Demographics 
According to the 2011 census Basantpur has a population of 4054.

Nearby villages 
 Heyatpur
 Jagdishpur
 Sangrampur
 Satwar

Notable people 
 Meraj Alam Ansari (Urdu: معراج عالم انصاری, born 12 January 1998) professionally known by his pen name Famyas Siwani (Urdu: فام یاس سیوانی, Hindi: फामयास सीवानी) is an Indian Urdu poet, writer and non-fiction Novelist from Sani Basantpur, Siwan, Bihar. He wrote his poetry in hindi and urdu languages and it's famous for verse, couplet and gazals under the Takhallus Famyas.

Note

References 

Villages in Siwan district